Virtual instrument software architecture (VISA) is a widely used application programming interface (API) in the test and measurement (T&M) industry for communicating with instruments from a computer. VISA is an industry standard implemented by several T&M companies, such as, Anritsu, Bustec, Keysight Technologies, Kikusui, National Instruments, Rohde & Schwarz, and Tektronix.

The VISA standard includes specifications for communication with resources (usually, but not always, instruments) over T&M-specific I/O interfaces such as GPIB and VXI.  There are also some specifications for T&M-specific protocols over PC-standard I/O, such as HiSLIP or VXI-11 (over TCP/IP) and USBTMC (over USB).

The VISA library has standardized the presentation of its operations over several software reuse mechanisms, including through a C API exposed from Windows DLL, visa32.dll, over the Microsoft COM technology, and through a .NET API. Although there are several VISA vendors and implementations, applications written against VISA are (nominally) vendor-interchangeable thanks to the standardization of VISA's presentation and operations/capabilities. Implementations from specific vendors  are also available for less common programming languages  and software reuse technologies.

History
VISA was originally standardized through the VXIplug&play Alliance, a now-defunct T&M standards body. The current standard, "VISA Specification 5.0", is maintained by the IVI Foundation.

See also
 Standard Commands for Programmable Instruments (SCPI)
 High Speed LAN Instrument Protocol (HiSLIP)
 Instrument driver

References

External links 
 Fast Remote Instrument Control with HiSLIP - Application Note
 IVI Foundation Specifications

Input/output
Electronic test equipment